Jake Blum is an American politician who served as a member of the North Dakota House of Representatives for the 42nd district from 2016 to 2019.

Early life and education 
Blum was born in Wausau, Wisconsin and raised in Wayzata, Minnesota. He earned a Bachelor of Science degree in political science and criminal justice from the University of North Dakota.

Career 
Blum is a public relations consultant and was a conservative activist. He formerly served as a campaign strategist for Senator Kevin Cramer and was a former employee of the Congressional Leadership Fund aside from his position in the legislature. Blum was previously the youngest elected official in the state of North Dakota.

In October 2019, Blum announced his resignation from the House and that he would be relocating to Minnesota. In February 2023, Blum was named National Political Director and Public Relations Manager for Primacy Strategy Group, a government relations and public affairs firm based in St. Paul, Minnesota.

References 

Living people
21st-century American politicians
Republican Party members of the North Dakota House of Representatives
University of North Dakota alumni
Politicians from Grand Forks, North Dakota
Year of birth missing (living people)